How Green Was My Valley is a British historical television drama series which originally aired on BBC One in eight parts during 1960. It is an adaptation of the 1939 novel How Green Was My Valley by Richard Llewellyn, set in a  Welsh coal-mining community.

Main cast
 Eynon Evans as  Gwylim Morgan Sr. (8 episodes)
 Rachel Thomas as Beth Morgan (8 episodes)
 Glyn Houston as Davy Morgan (7 episodes)
 William Squire as Rev. Merddyn Gruffydd (7 episodes)
 Sulwen Morgan as Angharad Morgan (6 episodes)
 Margaret John as Bronwen Morgan (5 episodes)
 Henley Thomas as Huw Morgan (4 episodes)
 Islwyn Evans as Huw Morgan (4 episodes)
 Anita Morgan as Ceinwen Phillips (4 episodes)
 Michael Forrest as Dai Bando (4 episodes)
 Hugh David as  Owen Morgan (3 episodes)
 Emrys James as  Gwilym Morgan Jr. (3 episodes)
 David Lyn as Ivor Morgan (3 episodes)

References

Bibliography
Ellen Baskin. Serials on British Television, 1950-1994. Scolar Press, 1996.

External links
 

BBC television dramas
1960 British television series debuts
1960 British television series endings
English-language television shows